(sic) is a Japanese electronicore band from Kobe that was formed in summer 2008. The band currently consists of vocalist So, keyboardist Minami, guitarist Taiki, drummer Tomonori, and bassist Tetsuya. They are best known for their heavy use of vocoder and synthesizer blended with emo/metalcore music and rave beats.

History

Founded in 2008 summer, the band was originally formed by members of the bands Ending for a Start and Blank Time. A year later, after an extensive search, So (former member of Bombreligion) joined as the sixth member.

In 2010, PAC started using their song "Evolution (Entering the New World)" as his theme music when wrestling in Dragon Gate.

In 2011, the song "Jump Around" from the band's EP Nextreme was selected to appear in the video game Pro Evolution Soccer 2012 (in Asia: World Soccer: Winning Eleven 2012) as the fourth track. The song "Chase the Light!" was used as the opening theme for Gyakkyō Burai Kaiji: Hakairoku-hen (逆境無頼カイジ 破戒録篇 lit. Suffering Outcast Kaiji: Maverick Arc). In late 2011, the band's song "Just Awake" was featured as the closing song in the Hunter × Hunter reboot anime; as a single it was released later in 2012.

On 22 June 2012, the band announced that they will be releasing their second studio album on 8 August, titled All That We Have Now, with a tour in September.

In April 2013, the band announced the release of their first DVD, called The Animals in Screen, scheduled to be out on 26 June. On 26 October, they announced a new single, "Rave-up Tonight", expected to be released on 15 January 2014, which is to be the theme song for Gundam Extreme VS. Maxi Boost. In September 2013, the founding bassist Mashu left the band, as a result, on their official website announced on 23 September 2013 that Kei replaced Mashu as the new bassist.

On 23 March 2014, the band announced that they will be releasing a new album this summer. The album release was announced at the Kobe World Memorial Hall live during their first headlining show. As a result, they will start a new tour. The song "Virtue and Vice" is featured as the opening theme for Gokukoku no Brynhildr and the song "Thunderclap" was made by the band for the third anime season of Sengoku Basara, subtitled Judge End. Both songs are taken from their third album, Phase 2. On 5 September, the band announced on their official site that they will release a new limited single on 7 January 2015 called "Let Me Hear". On 8 October, the short version of their new single premiered as the opening theme of Parasyte.

On 13 May 2015, the band released a new limited singles "Starburst" and "Struggle to Survive". A few days after the release of "Starburst", the band announced on their official site that they would be releasing their fourth studio album this autumn including the two main songs from their last two singles, "Starburst" and "Let Me Hear". On 12 August, the band released a new PV for the song "Cast Your Shell" which also was included to the album. On 16 August, they announced the title of the album as being Feeling of Unity which was released on 30 September 2015.

In 2017, the band signed onto a new label with Warner Music Japan. On 2 April 2017, the band announced on their official site the trailer for their new single, "Shine" on 23 June. On 26 May, they released a trailer for a PV for the song "Shine" with the full version being released the following month. The second single "Return to Zero" was released on 11 July. On 11 October, an PV was released for their new song "LLLD" which is featured on their newest fifth studio album New Sunrise. On 23 October, they released another new PV titled "The Sun Also Rises" which is the final track of the album. New Sunrise was released 25 October 2017 and includes the songs "Shine" and "Return to Zero".

On 31 January 2018, the band released a new PV for the song "Keep the Heat and Fire Yourself Up" which is also the opening for the anime Hakyū Hōshin Engi. The full single was released 2 May 2018. The band also provided "The Gong of Knockout" for the second opening for Netflix and TMS Entertainment's anime adaptation of Baki the Grappler in 2018. On 30 June, their official website announced that the guitarist, Sxun had left the band due to personal circumstances.

On 16 January 2019, the band's official website announced the bassist, Kei had died due to an acute heart failure at his home on midnight of 12 January. They discontinued a release of a new album and their Japanese tour in the spring of 2019. However, they announced that this will not stop the band's activity.

On 19 March, the band's official website announced to hold a tribute concert "Thanks to You All" in the memory of Kei on 7 June 2019 at the "Namba Hatch". The reason they chose "Namba Hatch" was because it was Kei's first live performance for the band. On 29 June, the band's official website announced that Tetsuya replaced Kei as the new bassist. On 4 December, the band released their sixth studio album titled Hypertoughness in Japan with an announcement that the worldwide release date is set on 15 January 2020.

Musical style
The band's musical style has been described as electronicore, post-hardcore, metalcore, dance-metal, and screamo.

Band members
Current members
 Minami – unclean vocals, rapping, keyboards, programming 
 Taiki – rhythm guitar ; backing vocals ; lead guitar 
 Tomonori – drums, percussion  
 So – clean vocals, backing unclean vocals, programming 
 Tetsuya – bass, backing vocals 

Former members
 Mashu – bass 
 Sxun – lead guitar ; clean vocals ; backing vocals 
 Kei – bass ; backing vocals

Timeline

Discography

Studio albums

Extended plays

Live albums

Singles

Music videos

Concert tours

Japanese tours
 Summer Sonic Festival with Various Artists (2011)
 Punkspring with Various Artists (2012)
 Summer Sonic Festival with Various Artists (2012)
 Punkspring with Various Artists (2013)
 Ozzfest Japan with Various Artists (2013)
 Summer Sonic Festival with Various Artists (2014)
 Monster Energy Outburn Tour with Various Artists (2014)
 Rising Sun Rock Festival with Various Artists (2015)
 Ozzfest Japan with Various Artists (2015)
 Summer Sonic Festival with Various Artists (2017)
 Fall Out Boy "Mania Tour" with Fear, and Loathing in Las Vegas as supporting act (2018)

World tours
 Ultra Korea in South Korea with Various Artists (2014)
 Heart-Town Festival in Taiwan with Various Artists (2015)
 Pentaport Rock Festival in South Korea with Various Artists (2015)
 Fear, and Loathing in Las Vegas – Live in Paris in France (2015)
 Megaport Music Festival in Taiwan with Various Artists (2017)

Awards and nominations

See also

 Japanese rock
 Electrocore

References

External links
  
 Official website in English
 
 Vegastation
 Fear, and Loathing in Las Vegas discography at Discogs
 Fear, and Loathing in Las Vegas discography on iTunes

2008 establishments in Japan
Electronicore musical groups
Japanese electronic rock musical groups
Musical groups established in 2008
Musical groups from Hyōgo Prefecture